Triesen is the third largest of Liechtenstein's municipalities. It contains several historic churches dating from the fifteenth century. It also has a weaving mill from 1863 that is considered a historical monument. The population is around 5,275.

Geography
It is located between Vaduz, Triesenberg and Balzers.

History
The settlements of Triesen, as the state archaeologists have found during excavations, were destroyed in natural disasters. The detailed picture of the place Triesen shows that all settlement phases were terminated by the forces of nature. It has been demonstrated that the settlements of the Bronze Age and the Iron Age were repeatedly destroyed by floods and landslides.

The coat of arms of the municipality Triesen consists of a shield with three superimposed silver scythes on a blue background.

Tourist attractions
Attractions in the Triesen area include: 
Die Pfarrkirche St. Gallus, built in 1455 and rebuilt in 1994, a square hall church
Die St.-Mamerta-Kapelle, the oldest chapel in the country, built in the 9th or early 10th century
Die Marienkapelle, a Romanesque building from the early 13th century
Das Kosthaus, an 1873-built working-class house
Kulturzentrum Gasometer, the Cultural Centre, with art exhibitions and other events
The Lawena Museum of electricity at Lawena Power Station

Notable people 

 Franz Burgmeier (born 1982 in Triesen) retired footballer, who last played as a midfielder for FC Vaduz
 Ursula Konzett (born 1959 in Triesen) a former Alpine skier

Gallery

References

External links

Official website
Liechtenstein Tourism

 
Municipalities of Liechtenstein